Red Rock 53 (formerly Parmachene 53) is a First Nations reserve in Thunder Bay District, Ontario. It is one of the reserves of the Red Rock Indian Band.

References

External links
 Canada Lands Survey System

Ojibwe reserves in Ontario
Communities in Thunder Bay District